These are the late night schedules on all three networks for each calendar season beginning September 1971. All times are Eastern/Pacific.

Talk/Variety shows are highlighted in yellow, Local News & Programs are highlighted in white.

Monday-Friday

Saturday/Sunday

By network

ABC

Returning Series
The Dick Cavett Show

CBS

Returning Series
The Merv Griffin Show

New Series
The CBS Late Movie

NBC

Returning Series
The Tonight Show Starring Johnny Carson
The Weekend Tonight Show

United States late night network television schedules
1971 in American television
1972 in American television